Acacia microsperma, commonly known as bowyakka, is a shrub of the genus Acacia and the subgenus Plurinerves that is endemic to an area of eastern Australia]. It is rated as least concern according to the Nature Conservation Act 1992.

Description
Like most species of Acacia it has phyllodes rather than true leaves. Following flowering firmly chartaceous seed pods form that resemble a string of beads.

Taxonomy
The species was first formally described by the botanist Leslie Pedley in 1974 as a part of the work Contributions from the Queensland Herbarium. Pedley reclassified it as Racosperma microspermum in 1987 but it was transferred back to genus Acacia in 2001.

Distribution
The tree has a scattered distribution across southern Queensland with a range that extends from around Adavale in the north west down to around the New South Wales border around Talwood where it is found growing in clay to shallow loamy soils over weathered rock as a part of open woodland along with Acacia cambagei or Eucalyptus thozetiana or sometimes forming dense stands of its own.

See also
List of Acacia species

References

microsperma
Taxa named by Leslie Pedley
Plants described in 1974
Flora of Queensland